Rieussec (meaning dry river) is a commune in the Hérault department in the Occitanie region in southern France.

Population

Geography
The Thoré has its source in the northern part of the commune.

See also
Communes of the Hérault department

References

Communes of Hérault